The Confederates were a barbershop quartet that performed in the 1950s and 1960s.

The group formed in September 1953 at a SPEBSQSA chapter meeting in Memphis, Tennessee. They consisted of:

 George Evans – tenor
 Dave LaBonte – lead
 Bill "Buz" Busby – baritone
 Wally Singleton – bass

The Confederates took first place in the 1956 SPEBSQSA International Quartet Championship after finishing second the year before. They were notable not only for their championship-caliber harmonies, but also for performing in Confederate officer uniforms.

The group stopped performing in 1969.

Discography
 Confederate Encores in Hi-Fi (1963; LP)

Notable songs
 "Save Your Confederate Money Boys, The South Shall Rise Again"
 "Creole Cutie"
 "Down Where the South Begins"
 "Chloe"
 "Red Head"
 "A Nightingale Sang in Berkeley Square"

References

Professional a cappella groups
Barbershop quartets
Musical groups established in 1953
Barbershop Harmony Society